Ariel Alfredo Montenegro Casella (born 3 November 1975) is an Argentine former footballer who played as a midfielder.

He also held an Italian passport, and spent most of his career in Spain, amassing Segunda División totals of 204 matches and 35 goals over eight seasons, mainly at the service of Córdoba.

Club career
Born in Buenos Aires, Montenegro played in his country for San Lorenzo de Almagro, Club Atlético Belgrano and Club Atlético Independiente, teaming up with sibling Daniel in the latter side. He moved to Spain in 2000, signing with Segunda División's Córdoba CF and remaining in the country the following eight years, without however making his debut in La Liga; in the former tier, he also represented CD Numancia and Hércules CF.

In the latter nation, Montenegro appeared for Pontevedra CF and Lucena CF in the Segunda División B, returning to his homeland in between to play for Gimnasia y Esgrima de Jujuy. In 2010, he moved back to Spain and joined lowly Peñarroya CF, retiring at nearly 37 after one season with the club – his second – in the regional championships.

Personal life
Montenegro's younger brother, Daniel, was also a footballer and a midfielder. He too played in Spain, and was an Argentina international.

References

External links

1975 births
Living people
Argentine people of Italian descent
Citizens of Italy through descent
Argentine footballers
Footballers from Buenos Aires
Association football midfielders
Argentine Primera División players
San Lorenzo de Almagro footballers
Club Atlético Belgrano footballers
Club Atlético Independiente footballers
Gimnasia y Esgrima de Jujuy footballers
Segunda División players
Segunda División B players
Tercera División players
Córdoba CF players
Pontevedra CF footballers
CD Numancia players
Hércules CF players
Lucena CF players
Argentine expatriate footballers
Expatriate footballers in Spain
Argentine expatriate sportspeople in Spain